Traian Vuia (until 1950 Bujor;) is a commune in Timiș County, Romania. It is composed of six villages: Jupani, Săceni, Sudriaș (commune seat), Surducu Mic, Susani and Traian Vuia.

It was the birthplace of inventor and aviator Traian Vuia (1872–1950). It was renamed to commemorate him after his death. Traian Vuia is located near near Lake Surduc.

Name

History 
The first recorded mention of Bujor dates from 1364. The locality had a high importance in the Middle Ages, being the center of a Vlach district. In 1453 this district had a knyaz, Dionysius, and was donated by King Ladislaus V to John Hunyadi. In 1596 the Bujor District was part of Hunyad County. Within its borders there was at that time the village of Baia, and a little further the village of Chitești, both disappeared.

In the past, the hearth of the village was in the Gladna Valley, on the place called "Little Village". Due to the frequent floods, in 1823 the village was moved to its present place, protected from floods.

Demographics 

Traian Vuia had a population of 2,059 inhabitants at the 2011 census, down 8% from the 2002 census. Most inhabitants are Romanians (88.68%), larger minorities being represented by Roma (5.54%) and Ukrainians (1.94%). For 2.91% of the population, ethnicity is unknown. By religion, most inhabitants are Orthodox (72.8%), but there are also minorities of Pentecostals (17.05%), Baptists (5.25%) and Roman Catholics (1.26%). For 2.91% of the population, religious affiliation is unknown.

Gallery

References 

Communes in Timiș County
Localities in Romanian Banat